!HERO is a 2003 Christian rock opera about Jesus. It is based on the question, "What if Jesus was born in Bethlehem, Pennsylvania?". After the original tour in 2003 ended, it was released on DVD, CD, and was written into a trilogy of novels and series of comic books.

Plot
!HERO is a rock opera modernizing Jesus's last two years of life, as narrated in the Bible. The story takes place in New York City, in Brooklyn. The world government in this near-future dystopic Earth is centered under the International Confederation of Nations (I.C.O.N.). Under the iron fist of I.C.O.N., nearly all religion in the world has been wiped out, except for small occult and mystic sects. Only one synagogue in Brooklyn exists. Currently, New York City is a police-occupied warzone between ethnic gangs and small, isolated revolutionary groups fighting I.C.O.N. Of all the ancient world religions, only Judaism survives and flourishes, at least, as much as it can.

In Bethlehem, Pennsylvania, a child named Jesus, but referred to as Hero, is born and forced to flee with his family to the small Jewish section of Brooklyn. Jesus grows up and begins to preach and teach the principles of Christianity to the people of New York City, teaching people to love their enemies and care for each other. I.C.O.N. realizes Hero is a threat, and the chief of police Devlin, with the help of chief Rabbi Kai (Caiaphas), conspire to end Hero's revolutionary teachings.

The Opera is narrated by "Agent Hunter", a former I.C.O.N. agent who met Hero and was soon thrown into prison for joining him against I.C.O.N. The opera also features Petrov (Peter), Maggie (Mary Magdalene), and Jude (Judas Iscariot) the latter who conspires with Kai and Devlin to betray Hero. The storyline progresses through several stories about Jesus' miracles and sermons, using references from the Bible's four gospels, continues through Jesus' execution, at the hands of I.C.O.N's angry mob, and eventually ending with his resurrection.

Recording cast

 Michael Tait – Hero
 Mark Stuart – Petrov
 Rebecca St. James – Maggie
 Paul Wright – Agent Hunter
 Nirva – Mama Mary
 John Cooper from Skillet – Chief Rabbi Kai
 Matt Hammitt from Sanctus Real – Blind Cripple
 T-Bone – Jairus
 Donnie Lewis – Jairus' Wife
 Pete Stewart – Police Chief Devlin, groom at the wedding
 Bob Farrell – Governor Pilate
 John Grey – Preacher Rabbi at the wedding
 Nathan Lee – Janitor Angel
 GRITS – Wedding Party
 Donna Stewart – bride at the wedding

Song list

Footnotes

References

External links 
Hero! Live On Stage DVD review at Jesus Freak Hideout

Rock operas
Christian rock
Rebecca St. James albums
American musicals
Christianity and government
Brooklyn in fiction